Devil in the Flesh may refer to:

 Devil in the Flesh (1947 film), a 1947 French film
 Devil in the Flesh, a 1969 Italian film 
 Devil in the Flesh (1986 film), a 1986 Italian film
 Devil in the Flesh (1989 film), a 1989 Australian film
 Devil in the Flesh (1998 film), a 1998 American horror film
 Devil in the Flesh 2, a 2000 American film
 Le Diable au corps (novel) (The Devil in the Flesh), a novel by Raymond Radiguet

See also
 Le Diable au corps (disambiguation)